Flavobacterium antarcticum  is a Gram-negative, aerobic and psychrotolerant bacterium from the genus of Flavobacterium which has been isolated from soil from a penguin habitat from King George Island in Antarctica.

References

 

antarcticum
Bacteria described in 2005